Robat-e Morad (also Romanized as Robāţ-e Morād; also known as Robāt Murad, Shahkoobeh, Shahkūbeh, Shahkūyeh, and Shāku) is a village in Galehzan Rural District, in the Central District of Khomeyn County, Markazi Province, Iran. At the 2006 census, its population was 1,738, in 555 families.

References 

Populated places in Khomeyn County